Gohort (also Romanized as Gahrt; also known as Bāvard and Gāhvard) is a village in Khatunabad Rural District, in the Central District of Shahr-e Babak County, Kerman Province, Iran. At the 2006 census, its population was 254, in 67 families.

References 

Populated places in Shahr-e Babak County